Bar Aftab-e Sefid (also Romanized as Bar Āftāb-e Sefīd; also known as Bar Āftāb-e Soflá) is a village in Tayebi-ye Sarhadi-ye Gharbi Rural District, Charusa District, Kohgiluyeh County, Kohgiluyeh and Boyer-Ahmad Province, Iran. At the 2006 census, its population was 66, in 13 families.

References 

Populated places in Kohgiluyeh County